is a Japanese video game developer known primarily for his involvement with Technos Japan Corp. He is best known for his work on beat 'em up games, as the original creator of the Kunio-kun and Double Dragon game franchises, having worked on the original arcade and NES installments in both series. While not the first side-scrolling martial arts action games (predated by Kung-Fu Master), they established the general template and conventions used by the beat 'em up genre since the late 1980s. He has thus sometimes been referred to as the grandfather of the beat 'em up genre. He is currently the President and Representative Director of a game company called Plophet.

Biography
In his teenage years as a high school student, he used to regularly get into fights on a daily basis, which was partly triggered by a break-up with a girl who dumped him. Kishimoto was also a fan of Bruce Lee's Hong Kong martial arts films, particularly Enter the Dragon (1973). These were formative influences that would later form the basis for his beat 'em up games Kunio-kun and Double Dragon.

Kishimoto began his video game designing career in the early 1980s after being employed by Data East, where he worked on the arcade laserdisc video games Cobra Command (also known as Thunder Storm) and Road Blaster. After leaving Data East, Kishimoto was employed by Technos Japan Corp. During his time on the company, he worked on the video games Nekketsu Kōha Kunio-kun (released in an altered form outside Japan under the title of Renegade) and Double Dragon. Both Kunio-kun and Double Dragon went on to become the main game franchises of Technos and helped established the side-scrolling beat-'em-up game genre (known as belt scroll action game genre in Japan).

After leaving Technos during the 1990s, Kishimoto worked as a freelance game designer and producer for various game companies while working under the trade name of Plophet. In 2000, he began working as a game developer for the "Plus e" platform, a computer terminal distributed to family restaurants in Japan. During his freelance career, he also acted as producer for budget games released in Japan, such as The Dungeon RPG for the PlayStation and Rogue: Hearts Dungeon for the PlayStation 2.

On April 1, 2010, Kishimoto founded Plophet Co., Ltd., a self-employed company named after the trade name he used during his freelance days. He has served as a creative consultant for sequels to Technos' former IPs such as Double Dragon Neon and River City Ransom: Underground.

Works
 Pro Soccer (1982, arcade) – Sub-director
 Cobra Command (1984, Laserdisc) – Director
 Road Blaster (1984, Laserdisc) – Director
 Renegade (1986, arcade) – Director
 Renegade (1987, NES) – Director
 Double Dragon (1987, arcade) – Director
 Super Dodge Ball (1987, arcade) – Director
 Double Dragon (1988, NES) – Director
 China Gate (1988, arcade) – Director
 U.S. Championship V'Ball (1988, arcade) – Director
 Double Dragon II: The Revenge (1988, arcade) – Director
 WWF Superstars (1989, arcade) – Director
 Super Spike V'Ball (1989, NES) – Production Manager
 Double Dragon II: The Revenge (1989, NES) – Producer
 Blockout (1989, arcade) – Producer
 Double Dragon III: The Sacred Stones (1991, NES) – Director
 WWF Wrestlefest (1991, arcade) – Director
 Sugoro Quest: The Quest of Dice Heros (1991, Famicom) – Producer
 Shodai Nekketsu Kōha Kunio-kun (1992, Super Famicom) – Producer
 Super Bowling (1992, Super NES) – Producer
 Super Double Dragon (1992, Super NES) – Direct Support
 The Combatribes (1992, Super NES) – Producer
 Shin Nekketsu Kōha: Kunio-tachi no Banka (1994, Super Famicom) – Director
 Sugoro Quest ++: Dicenics (1994, Super Famicom) – Producer
 Othello World 2:Yume to Michi e no Chōsen (1995, PlayStation) – Producer
 Chō Aniki: Kyūkyoku Muteki Ginga Saikyō Otoko (1995, PlayStation) – Producer
 Chō Aniki: Kyūkyoku... Otoko no Gyakushū (1996, Sega Saturn) – Producer
 Slam Dragon (1996, PlayStation) – Producer
 Cowboy Bebop (1998, PlayStation) – Producer
 Gunya Gunya (1999, PC) – Producer
 Simple 1500 Series Vol. 28: The Dungeon RPG (2000, PlayStation) – Development Producer and Director
 Bau Nyā Chū (2000, PC) – Producer
 River City Ransom: Underground (2014, PC, Mac) – Creative Consultant
 Double Dragon IV (2017, PlayStation 4, PC, Switch) – Director

References

External links
Yoshihisa Kishimoto's personal homepage 
Plophet 

Japanese video game designers
1961 births
Living people